La Celle-sur-Nièvre (literally La Celle on Nièvre) is a commune in the Nièvre department in central France.

Geography
The commune is made up of five villages, La Celle-sur-Nièvre, Mauvrain, Gagy, Saint-Lay and Le Bas de La Celle.
It is surrounded by French Oak forests and is in the Coteaux Charitois wine region.

Administration

The Mayor is Mme Ginette Saulnier who has been in office since 2008 and will hold office until 2026; she was preceded by M. Camille Melaye

As in most communes there is a local school based in the same building as the Mairie (Townhall).

Demography
Being a small commune of only 167 people there are however a variety of different nationalities represented locally, Portuguese, Norwegian, English, Dutch and Irish to name a few and to add to that are the second or family home owners many now living in Paris.

Other
There are two local wine growers both with tasting at Mauvrain. It also achieves note for the local Charolais cattle.

The nearest shop is in the bar at Beaumont-la-Ferrière, a small town about  distance where English is spoken. Vans visit the outlying villages to sell their produce.

La Celle has a Church St Martin's but it is only open for special events or in rotation for services. The church is otherwise available in Beaumont.

See also
Communes of the Nièvre department

References

Communes of Nièvre